Darker than Black is a Japanese anime television series created and directed by Tensai Okamura and animated by Bones. The series was broadcast for twenty-five episodes on MBS, TBS and their affiliated stations from April 6 to September 28, 2007.

A sequel, titled Darker than Black: Gemini of the Meteor was broadcast for twelve episodes from October 9 to December 25, 2009.

A sidesequel to Darker than Black and a prequel to Darker than Black: Gemini of the Meteor, titled Darker than Black: Gaiden, was included on the second, fourth, sixth and eighth collected Blu-ray and DVD sets of Darker than Black: Gemini of the Meteor released from January 27 to July 21, 2010.

Series overview

Episode list

Darker than Black (2007)

Darker than Black: Gemini of the Meteor (2009)

Notes

References 

Darker than Black